John William Egerton, 7th Earl of Bridgewater FRS (14 April 1753 – 21 October 1823), known as John Egerton until 1803, was a British cavalry officer, and Tory politician who sat in the House of Commons from 1777 to 1803 when he succeeded to the peerage as Earl of Bridgewater. He was from the Egerton family.

Biography
Egerton was the eldest son of the Right Reverend John Egerton, Bishop of Durham, and the grandson of the Right Reverend Henry Egerton, Bishop of Hereford, youngest son of John Egerton, 3rd Earl of Bridgewater. His mother was Lady Anne Sophia Grey.

He joined the British Army in 1771 and was promoted to captain in 1776, to major in 1779, and to lieutenant-colonel in 1790.  He was promoted to colonel of 7th Light Dragoons in 1793, but in 1797 transferred to be Colonel of 14th Light Dragoons, serving under Major-general Craufurd during the Peninsular War to great acclaim.  He remained colonel of the 14th Dragoons for the rest of his life and was promoted major-general in 1795, lieutenant-general in 1802 and full general in 1812.

Egerton also sat as a Tory Member of Parliament for Morpeth from 1777 to 1780 and for Brackley from 1780 to 1803. The latter year, on the death of his first cousin once removed, Francis Egerton, 3rd Duke of Bridgewater, he succeeded as seventh Earl of Bridgewater.

He was elected a Fellow of the Royal Society in 1808. and a Fellow of the Society of Antiquaries (F.S.A.) on 4 February 1808.

Lord Bridgewater died in October 1823, aged 70. On 14 January 1783 he had married Charlotte Catherine Anne (died 1849 aged 85), only daughter and heir of Samuel Haynes. Their marriage was childless, and therefore his younger brother Francis inherited the title of Earl of Bridgewater.  Egerton left his estates in Bedfordshire, Buckinghamshire, Cheshire, Durham, Flintshire, Hertfordshire, Middlesex, Northamptonshire, Oxfordshire, Shropshire and Yorkshire to John, Viscount Alford, provided he had managed to become Duke or Marquess of Bridgwater with a suitable remainder.  John did not fulfil the proviso in the will, failing in court to persuade the judge.  However his heir got the clause declared illegal, so the 2nd Earl Brownlow commenced a damaging and lengthy case of litigation that in 1851 resulted in the Egerton family forfeiting the estates.

Monuments and memorials

Lord Bridgewater is commemorated by a memorial at the Bridgewater Chapel at St. Peter and St. Paul Church, Little Gaddesden. In the early 17th century, Thomas Egerton, 1st Viscount Brackley, had purchased Ashridge House, one of the largest country houses in England, from Queen Elizabeth I, who had inherited it from her father who had appropriated it after the dissolution of the monasteries in 1539. Ashridge House served the Egerton family as a residence until the 19th century. The Egertons later had a family chapel with burial vault in Little Gaddesden Church, where many monuments commemorate the Dukes and Earls of Bridgewater and their families.

Notes

References

 
 
  cites:

External links

1753 births
1823 deaths
14th King's Hussars officers
British Army generals
Members of the Parliament of Great Britain for English constituencies
British MPs 1774–1780
British MPs 1780–1784
British MPs 1784–1790
British MPs 1790–1796
British MPs 1796–1800
Members of the Parliament of the United Kingdom for English constituencies
UK MPs 1801–1802
UK MPs 1802–1806
UK MPs who inherited peerages
07
John
Fellows of the Royal Society
Fellows of the Society of Antiquaries of London
British Army personnel of the Peninsular War